Fitzgibbon Hospital is a historic hospital building located at Marshall, Saline County, Missouri. The original two-story Classical Revival style section was built in 1923, with a five-story Modern Movement style addition constructed in 1955. The original rectangular brick section features a two-story projecting portico and limestone trim and decorative panels.  The 1955 addition consists of irregularly massed blocks at different heights.

It was added to the National Register of Historic Places in 2012.

References

Hospital buildings on the National Register of Historic Places in Missouri
Neoclassical architecture in Missouri
Modernist architecture in Missouri
Hospital buildings completed in 1923
Buildings and structures in Saline County, Missouri
National Register of Historic Places in Saline County, Missouri
1923 establishments in Missouri